Burma Command was a British Army command formed for the coordination of the defences of Burma. It functioned from 1937 to 1942, when the country fell to Japanese Forces during the Second World War, and functioned again from 1945 to 1948, when the country secured independence from the UK.

History
Before the formation of the command, Burma had functioned as independent district within the British Indian Army. The last General Officer Commanding Burma Independent District was Major-General William Twiss who commanded from 1936 to 1937. In April 1937, when Burma became a semi-autonomous country, it was decided to separate the command from the British Indian Army. Initially Burma Command came under the direct command of the Governor of British Burma as commander-in-chief. However with the Second World War imminent, responsibility was delegated to Lieutenant-General Kenneth McLeod as the first General Officer Commanding in January 1939.

Once Rangoon had fallen to Japanese troops on the 5/6 March 1942 and Mandalay had fallen shortly thereafter, the command was disbanded.

After the war it was reformed from the core of the Twelfth Army on 1 October 1945. It was disbanded again when Burma became an independent country under the Burma Independence Act 1947 in January 1948.

Commanders
Commanders included:
 Lieutenant-General Kenneth McLeod: 1939 – 1941
 Lieutenant-General Thomas Hutton: 1941 – 1942
 General Sir Harold Alexander: March 1942 – May 1942
Under Japanese rule from 1942 to 1945
 Lieutenant-General Harold Briggs: 1945 – 1948

References

External links
 Burma Army

Commands of the British Army
Military units and formations established in 1930
Military units and formations disestablished in 1942